Big Sky High School is an American public high school in Missoula, Montana, United States, opened in 1980. The school made Missoula the first city in Montana to have four secondary schools. It is a part of the Missoula County Public Schools.

Extracurricular activities

Band
Bands at Big Sky include Symphonic Band, Wind Ensemble, Jazz Band, Pep Band, and Big Sky Eagle Marching Band. All students in concert bands are required to participate in the marching band. The marching band performs at two football games per year and at the University of Montana homecoming parade. They have traveled to perform in places such as Carnegie Hall in New York City and the Rose Parade in California. In 2014, the band travelled to Honolulu, Hawaii, to perform at the 29th annual Pacific Basin Music Festival along with the choir.

Choir
The school has four different choirs: a beginning men's choir, a beginning women's choir (Chorale), an advanced women's choir (Treble Choir), and a mixed advanced choir (Aesirian Choir). There is also an audition-only extracurricular choir called Sky Blues.

Drama
The drama department has produced over one hundred full-length productions since the school's opening in 1980. They work closely with Way Off Broadway Theater Company. The department has an annual Fall Cabaret Show, where students write or direct the performances. The department also has the Spring Dance Concert.

Speech and debate
In the 2014-2015 season the Big Sky speech and debate team grew to be the fourth-largest in the state, in spite of the school having the smallest enrollment in its class.

Athletics

Boys' basketball
Boys' soccer
Cross country
Football
Girls' basketball
Girls' soccer
Golf
Softball
Swimming
Tennis
Track and field
Volleyball
Wrestling
Tennis

Notable alumni
Chance McKinney, country singer
Joslyn Tinkle, WNBA forward for Seattle Storm (daughter of Wayne Tinkle)
Larry Krystkowiak, former NBA player, former Utah men's basketball coach
Jordan Tripp,  former NFL  Linebacker

References

External links

1980 establishments in Montana
Educational institutions established in 1980
Public high schools in Montana
Schools in Missoula County, Montana